Falcon's Revenge is an adventure module published in 1990 for the Advanced Dungeons & Dragons fantasy role-playing game.

Plot summary
Falcon's Revenge is an adventure scenario in which the player characters must find an evil cult growing in the City of Greyhawk. The module includes fold-up cardstock buildings which can be used to create a site by a wharf.

Publication history
WGA1 Falcon's Revenge was written by Richard W. and Anne Brown, with a cover by Ken Frank, and was published by TSR in 1990 as a 64-page booklet with cardstock sheets and an outer folder.

This adventure is part of a series of three scenarios that starts with WGA1 Falcon's Revenge, continues with WGA2 Falconmaster, and concludes with WGA3 Flames of the Falcon.

Reception

Reviews
GamesMaster International Issue 1 - Aug 1990

References

Greyhawk modules
Role-playing game supplements introduced in 1990